Omalotheca sylvatica, also called woodland arctic cudweed, is a species of plant from family Asteraceae found in Eastern United States and British Columbia, on the lawns, roads, and in the forests. For the plant to grow, the roads shall not be in shade, and lowly grassed.

Distribution
Aside from growing on the roads and lawns of the United States, it is also common in Adirondack Mountains.

References

Flora of the United States
Flora of Canada